Charles Samuel Dubin (February 1, 1919 – September 5, 2011) was an American film and television director.

From the early 1950s to 1991, Dubin worked in television, directing episodes of Tales of Tomorrow, Omnibus, The Defenders, The Big Valley, The Virginian, Hawaii Five-O, M*A*S*H, Matlock, The Rockford Files, Kojak , Murder, She Wrote and among other notable series. Perhaps his highest-profile work was the 1965 television version of Rodgers and Hammerstein's Cinderella, starring Lesley Ann Warren.

Life and career
Dubin was born Charles Samuel Dubronevski  in Brooklyn, New York, to a Russian Jewish family. He attended Samuel J. Tilden High School, and first became interested in the arts by wanting to pursue a career as an opera singer. After graduating from high school, he attended Brooklyn College, studying drama, and acted in a number of stage productions, before graduating in 1941.  He then attended Neighborhood Playhouse in Manhattan studying stage managing and directing. He continued to act and sing in stage productions working as an understudy.

In 1950, he was hired by ABC, as an associate director and,  within a few months, was soon promoted to head director, later going on to direct a number of notable series spanning 30 years. In 1958, Dubin was named in the Hollywood blacklist. He refused to testify and he was never cited for contempt, but was fired by NBC.

He directed more episodes of the popular 1970s television comedy M*A*S*H than anyone else.

Dubin retired in 1991 at the age of 70, after 39 years in television and 48 years in entertainment. His last television directing credit was the series Father Dowling Mysteries starring Tom Bosley.

Marriage
He was married to Daphne Elliott, with whom he had two children. They divorced in 1975. Later he married author and filmmaker Mary Lou Chayes,

Death
On September 5, 2011, Dubin died of natural causes, he was 92 years old.

References

External links

Charles S. Dubin interview, Archive of American Television

1919 births
2011 deaths
American people of Russian-Jewish descent
American television directors
Brooklyn College alumni
Daytime Emmy Award winners
People from Brooklyn
Directors Guild of America Award winners
Samuel J. Tilden High School alumni
Film directors from New York City